= Tipsuda Thavaramara =

- ทิพยสุดา ถาวรามร
- Citizenship: Thailand
- Education: Harvard University (BA); Wharton School of the University of Pennsylvania (MBA)
- Occupations: Economist, civil servant
- Employer(s): Securities and Exchange Commission of Thailand
- Known for: Capital market development in Thailand
- Office: Deputy Secretary-General of the Securities and Exchange Commission of Thailand

Tipsuda Thavaramara (Thai: ทิพยสุดา ถาวรามร) is a Thai economist and civil servant who served as the Deputy Secretary-General of Thailand's Securities and Exchange Commission between 2014 and 2019. She was in charge of the policy and corporate finance groups.

== Education ==
Thavaramara received her MBA from the Wharton School at the University of Pennsylvania, and her BA in Mathematics from Harvard University.

== Career ==
Thavaramara joined the SEC in 1993, and has extensive experience in capital market development. She played an active role in creating the Thai Bond Market Association, drafting the Derivatives Law, launching the Thailand Futures Exchange, and formulating the implementation plan for ASEAN capital market integration. She also served on the Board of the Government Pension Fund from 2007 to 2011.

== Publications ==
- Experiences of Financial Distress in Thailand - World Bank Publications - by Tipsuda Sundaravej and Prasarn Trairatvorakul
- One decade SEC : first decade of the Thai SEC and capital market in Thailand (1992–2002) - Member of Editorial Team
- Ending the SET monopoly raises lengthy questions - Bangkok Post, April 30, 2012
